Muhra is one of the 24 blocks of Gaya district in the Indian state of Bihar.  It is part of Neemchak Bathani subdivision.  The population was 100,820 at the 2011 Indian census.

Geography 
Muhra is located in the northeastern part of Gaya district, bounded by Atri block on the north and west, Neemchak Bathani block on the north, Nawada district on the southeast and Wazirganj Municipality on the south.

Villages 
According to the 2011 census, Muhra comprises 54 villages, of which 49 are inhabited:

References

Community development blocks in Gaya district